USS St. Mary's River (LSM(R)-528) was originally authorized as LSM-528. Reclassified LSM(R)-528 on 21 April 1945, she was laid down on 19 May 1945 at the Brown Shipbuilding Co., Inc., Houston, Texas, launched on 16 June 1945, and commissioned on 2 September 1945.

On 6 September, LSM(R)-528 sailed for Galveston, Texas, arriving the next day. She sailed for Charleston, South Carolina, on 12 September. However, after two days at sea, she ran into a storm and was diverted to Naval Frontier Base, Burrwood, Louisiana. After the storm, LSM(R)-528 resumed her voyage and arrived at Charleston on 21 September. While there, the ship had her rocket launchers and mortars installed.

Departing Charleston on 12 October, LSM(R)-528 sailed for Little Creek, VA, arriving on 14 October. After leave and upkeep, she began shakedown training on 15 October. Completing shakedown training on 15 November, she reported a week later to Commander LSM(R) Squadrons, Little Creek. On 29 November, she sailed for Green Cove Springs, FL, with orders to report for inactivation. LSM(R)-528 was decommissioned in March 1946. Named St. Mary's River on 1 October 1958 for the St. Marys River in northeast Indiana, she was struck from the Navy List on the same day. She was sold on 4 August 1959 to Fleet Storage Corp. Her name disappeared from mercantile list in 1989.

References

External links
 NavSource Online: Amphibious Photo Archive USS St Marys River (LSMR-528)
 hazegray.org: USS St. Mary's River

 

Ships built in Houston
LSM(R)-501-class medium landing ships
World War II amphibious warfare vessels of the United States
1945 ships